Węgry  (German Wengern) is a village in the administrative district of Gmina Turawa, within Opole County, Opole Voivodeship, in south-western Poland. 

The village has an approximate population of 800.

References

Villages in Opole County